Bravia (Bryansk Air Enterprise) was an airline based in Bryansk, Russia. It operates scheduled and charter passenger and cargo services in central Russia. It was formerly known as Aeroflot Bryansk Division.

Code data
ICAO Code: BRK

Fleet
The Bravia fleet consists of the following aircraft (at January 2005):

3 Yakovlev Yak-40
2 Yakovlev Yak-40K

Defunct airlines of Russia
Former Aeroflot divisions
Companies based in Bryansk Oblast